This is Anita is a reissue of Anita, a 1956 album by Anita O'Day that was re-released in 1962.

It was arranged and conducted by Buddy Bregman and was the first in a series of albums recorded by O'Day for Verve. Norman Granz was the producer on this album, and it was the first album to be released under his new label, thus paving the way for the future recordings from Verve, and this album was O'Day's first stint from the big band recordings of the 1940s and early 1950s.

Track listing

Side One
 "You're the Top" (Cole Porter) — 2:24
 "Honeysuckle Rose" (Andy Razaf, Fats Waller) — 3:13
 "A Nightingale Sang in Berkeley Square" (Manning Sherwin, Eric Maschwitz) — 4:00
 "Who Cares?" (George Gershwin, Ira Gershwin) — 3:14
 "I Can't Get Started" (I. Gershwin, Vernon Duke) — 3:53
 "Fine and Dandy" (Kay Swift, Paul James (pseudonym for James Paul Warburg) — 2:25

Side Two
 "As Long as I Live" (Harold Arlen) — 3:39
 "No Moon at All" (Redd Evans, David Mann) — 2:28
 "Time After Time" (Sammy Cahn, Jule Styne) — 4:06
 "I'll See You in My Dreams" (Isham Jones, Gus Kahn) — 2:50
 "I Fall In Love Too Easily" (Cahn, Styne) — 2:54
 "Beautiful Love" (Haven Gillespie, Wayne King, Egbert Van Alstyne, Victor Young) — 2:37

Personnel
 Anita O'Day – vocals
 Milt Bernhart – trombone
 Joe Howard – trombone
 Lloyd Ulyate – trombone
 Si Zentner – trombone
 Paul Smith – piano, celeste
 Corky Hale – harp
 Barney Kessel – guitar
 Joe Mondragon – double bass
 Alvin Stoller – drums

References

1956 albums
Albums arranged by Buddy Bregman
Albums produced by Norman Granz
Anita O'Day albums
Verve Records albums
Reissue albums